Tahirpur is an upazila of Sunamganj District in the Division of Sylhet, Bangladesh.

Geography
It has 21987 households and total area 313.7 km².

History
The territory of Tahirpur Upazila contains the historic village of Nabagram (in Badaghat Union), which served as the capital of the Laur Kingdom. After the Conquest of Sylhet in 1303, some disciples of warrior-saint Shah Jalal migrated and settled in present-day Tahirpur where they preached Islam to the local people. Most notably, Shah Rafiuddin migrated here and is buried in Sarping on the border with Meghalaya on top of Laur Hill. In the 18th century, Tahirpur became a part of Brajendra Kishore Roy Chowdhury's zamindari based in Gouripur House in Mymensingh. For most of its history, the lower caste Hindus formed the majority of the area's population. During the British Raj, the local council resolved a false accusation against a Bengali Muslim by the name of Tahir Ali. Following this, Tahir Ali settled in this area, renaming it to Tahirpur. Tahirpur was established as a thana in 1924.

During the Bangladesh Liberation War of 1971, a refugee camp was established in Tahirpur on the footsteps of the Khasi and Jaintia Hills. 10 farmers were killed and several arrested during the Bhasan-Pani Movement between 1997 and 1998.

Demographics
As of the 1991 Bangladesh census, Tahirpur has a population of 155188. Males constitute 51.67% of the population, and females 48.33%. This Upazila's  population is 64325. Tahirpur has an average literacy rate of 31.2% (7+ years), and the national average of 30.4% literate.

Administration
Tahirpur has 7 Unions/Wards, 136 Mauzas/Mahallas, and 244 villages. Its unions are North Baradal, Badaghat, North Sripur, Tahirpur Sadar, South Baradal, South Sripur and Balijuri.

Chairman : Koruna Sindhu Chowdhury Babul

Women Vice Chairman :Achiya Afendi

Vice Chairman : Akhonji

Upazila Nirbahi Officer (UNO):

Economy
As the saying goes, fish-stone-paddy is the lifeblood of Sunamganj. And one of the suppliers of this fish-stone-paddy is Tahirpur upazila. So, these are one of the sources of economy of this upazila. Boro paddy in Haor in particular is the main source. And after that there are haor fish. Lots of fish are also caught in the river. The sand of Fazilpur of Tahirpur upazila is famous in the country and it is the only limestone mine in the country. In a word, Tahirpur Upazila is famous for its fish, rocks, sand and paddy. Poor people make a living by fishing in rivers, extracting rocks, extracting sand or working in paddy fields. Although agriculture is the main occupation, there is a lot of interest in trade and commerce lately. Basically, due to the real fearlessness of paddy cultivation, the fate of the people of this upazila fluctuates even in the face of water scarcity.

Education
The progress of Tahirpur Upazila in the field of education is very low. There are two colleges in this upazila. A government high school. There are only two girls' high schools. There are also various primary schools, madrasas and other educational systems.

Notable people
Advaita Acharya (1434-1559), Hindu religious leader
Maqbul Hossain Choudhury (1898-1957), activist and politician
Shahed Ali (1925-2001), educationist and activist
Hassan Shahriar (1946-2021), political analyst and columnist

See also
Upazilas of Bangladesh
Districts of Bangladesh
Divisions of Bangladesh

References

https://www.tahirpur.com/

Upazilas of Sunamganj District